Kurt Lüdecke (5 February 1890, in Berlin – 1960, in Prien am Chiemsee) was an ardent German nationalist and international traveler who joined the Nazi party in the early 1920s and who used his social connections to raise money for the NSDAP. Before attending a rally at which Adolf Hitler was a featured speaker, Lüdecke had assumed that Hitler was simply "one more fanatic" but after hearing Hitler speak at a mass demonstration at the Königsplatz in Munich, he adopted Hitler as his hero: "His appeal to German manhood was like a call to arms, the gospel he preached a sacred truth." The next day, he spoke to Hitler for four hours and offered himself to Hitler and the Nazi cause "without reservation ... I had given him my soul."

Activities
In the wake of the uproar over the Law for the Protection of the Republic, after the assassination of Walther Rathenau, an unrealistic plan for a coup d'état in Munich was hatched by civil servant Dr. Otto Pittinger. The nationalist organizations (including the Nazis) would overthrow the Bavarian government via a putsch and replace it with a dictatorship under Gustav Ritter von Kahr, the former minister president of Bavaria. Lüdecke's mission was to help coordinate support of the Northern German right-wing revolutionaries in preparation for spreading the putsch throughout Germany.

Upon his return to Bavaria, Lüdecke found that Pittinger was going on vacation instead of running a coup and that Hitler was furious, announcing to Lüdecke that he would never again rely on others for help in a coup.

Lüdecke offered his services to Hitler as an envoy to Benito Mussolini soon after the Italian dictator marched on Rome and rose to power in Italy. His attempts to raise money from Mussolini were not productive. But Lüdecke persuaded Mussolini to send Leo Negrelli to Munich to interview Hitler on October 16, 1923, for the Corriere Italiano, providing visibility for the Nazis in Italy.

Lüdecke also visited Henry Ford in Michigan to see if Ford, a wealthy industrialist, would contribute funds to the struggling Nazi Party. Lüdecke's introduction was provided by Siegfried and Winifred Wagner, who were Hitler supporters. However, Ford declined to contribute.

Possibly due to his association with Ernst Röhm, Hitler became suspicious of him, as of many others in the early group, imprisoned him and apparently had him marked for the first great blood purge (The Night of the Long Knives), but Lüdecke escaped to Czechoslovakia and then to America, where he landed on the day many of his former associates were assassinated.

The reflections and memoirs of Lüdecke are sometimes relied upon by historians.

I Knew Hitler
Lüdecke's chief work, and major claim to fame, is his book I Knew Hitler, an early study and exposé of the German Fuhrer by an ex-Nazi activist (Lüdecke himself) who had joined the Nazi movement in 1922. Originally published by Scribners in 1937, the 833-page book, subtitled The Story of a Nazi Who Escaped the Blood-Purge, was reissued by Pen and Sword in 2013. Credit for assistance in writing and editing the book has been given to Paul Mooney (1904–1939), who also served as secretary and literary assistant to famed travel writer Richard Halliburton. The fullest account of the collaboration between Lüdecke and Mooney is in Horizon Chasers—The Lives and Adventures to Richard Halliburton and Paul Mooney (McFarland, 2007). I Knew Hitler is hailed in Horizon Chasers as "a masterpiece of political self-vindication" and, "with its counterplay of fact and aside," a work that reaches "high levels of sociologic contemplation, and in its studious portraits (of various Nazi leaders), of Tacitean éclat."

Footnotes

References
 ("Browder")
  ("Bullock")
  ("Carsten")
 ("Collier")
  ("Fest")
  ("Fischer")
   ("Grant")
  ("Hoffman")

  ("Lemmons")
  ("Ludecke")
  ("Machtan")
Max, Gerry, "I Knew Hitler," Horizon Chasers—The Lives and Adventures of Richard Halliburton and Paul Mooney (McFarland, 2007), pp. 119–129, quoted at p. 129.  Contains photographs of Ludecke.
  ("Nyomarkay")
  ("Read")
   ("Toland")

1890 births
1960 deaths
Nazi Party members
Views on Adolf Hitler
German memoirists
Writers from Berlin
20th-century memoirists